"Don Quixote" is a song by English singer-songwriter Nik Kershaw from his 1984 studio album The Riddle. Released in August 1985 as the final single from that album, it reached No. 10 on the UK Singles Chart in September 1985, and became Kershaw's seventh (and last) consecutive UK top 20 hit single.

A month before "Don Quixote" was released as a single, it was the second of four songs played by Kershaw at Live Aid. The others were previous singles "The Riddle", "Wouldn't It Be Good" and "Wide Boy".

Background
While discussing his method of writing lyrics, Kershaw explained the song's origins in the January 1986 issue of music technology magazine Sound on Sound.

Track listing
7" single (WEA NIK 8)
A. "Don Quixote" - 4:11
B. "Don't Lie" - 3:52

12" single (WEA NIKT 8)
A. "Don Quixote" (Extra Special Long Mix)- 8:41	
B. "Don't Lie" - 3:52

Chart performance

References

Nik Kershaw songs
1985 singles
Songs written by Nik Kershaw
MCA Records singles
Song recordings produced by Peter Collins (record producer)
1984 songs
Music based on Don Quixote